Marianne Mithun  (born 1946) is an American linguist specializing in American Indian languages and language typology. She is a professor of linguistics at the University of California at Santa Barbara, where she has held an academic position since 1986.

Career 
She began her career with extensive fieldwork on Iroquoian languages, especially Mohawk, Cayuga, and Tuscarora, earning her PhD in Linguistics from Yale in 1974 with a dissertation entitled "A Grammar of Tuscarora" (Floyd Lounsbury, dissertation supervisor). Her work spans a number of linguistic subfields, including morphology, syntax,  discourse, prosody, language contact and change, typology, language documentation, and the interrelations among these subfields.  She has worked on a wide variety of languages from a wide variety of language families, but specializes in Native American languages. Besides Iroquoian languages, she has also worked in California on Central Pomo and the Chumashan languages, on Central Alaskan Yup'ik, and on the Austronesian language Kapampangan.

Mithun compiled a comprehensive overview of Native American languages in The Languages of Native North America. A review on the Linguist List describes the work as "an excellent book to have as a reference" and as containing "an incredible amount of information and illustrative data." The work is a bipartite reference organized firstly by grammatical categories (including categories that are particularly widespread in North America, such as polysynthesis), and secondly by family.

Mithun and her husband, linguist Wallace Chafe, established and directed The Wallace Chafe and Marianne Mithun Fund for Research on Understudied Languages.  The fund provides support for graduate students to cover expenses associated with language documentation projects for understudied languages.

Awards and honors 
Mithun has taught at many institutions around the world, including Georgetown, La Trobe, Rice, Stanford, SUNY Albany, Amsterdam, Cagliari, Berkeley, Hamburg, UIUC, UNM, Wake Forest, and Yale.

Mithun was the founding president of the Society for Linguistic Anthropology from 1983 to 1985. From 1999 to 2003 she was president of the Association for Linguistic Typology. From 2014 to 2015 she was president of The Societas Linguistica Europaea. She is a member of the Norwegian Academy of Science and Letters.

In 2002 The Languages of Native North America won the Leonard Bloomfield Book Award, awarded annually by the Linguistic Society of America for the best book in linguistics.

In 2019, Mithun served as the vice president/president-elect of the Linguistic Society of America (LSA), and in 2020 she served as the 95th President of the LSA.

In 2021, she was awarded the Neil and Saras Smith Medal for Linguistics by the British Academy "for her research into Native American and Austronesian languages which represent a significant contribution to theoretical linguistics".

Selected works
 1984. "The evolution of noun incorporation." Language 60: 847–894.
 1991. "Active/Agentive case marking and its motivations." Language 67: 510–546.
 1999. The Languages of Native North America. Cambridge, UK: Cambridge University Press.
 2001. "Who shapes the record: The speaker and the linguist." Linguistic Fieldwork: Essays on the Practice of Empirical Linguistic Research. Paul Newman and Martha Ratliff, eds. Cambridge: Cambridge University Press. 34-54.

References

External links

1946 births
Living people
Linguists from the United States
Women linguists
Members of the Norwegian Academy of Science and Letters
University of California, Santa Barbara faculty
Linguists of Na-Dene languages
Linguists of Algic languages
Linguists of Siouan languages
Linguists of Salishan languages
Linguists of Iroquoian languages
Linguists of Chumashan languages
Linguists of Pomoan languages
Linguists of Muskogean languages
Linguists of Uto-Aztecan languages
20th-century linguists
21st-century linguists
Yale University alumni
Recipients of the Neil and Saras Smith Medal for Linguistics
Linguistic Society of America presidents
Fellows of the Linguistic Society of America